"Come as You Are" is a song by American rock band Nirvana, written by frontman and guitarist Kurt Cobain. It is the third track and the second single from the band's second studio album Nevermind, released in March 1992. It was the band's second and final American top 40 hit, reaching number 32 on the Billboard Hot 100, and second UK top 10 hit, reaching number nine on the UK Singles Chart. The single reached the top 10 in eight countries and the top 40 in eleven further countries.

The unexpected success of the album's lead single, "Smells Like Teen Spirit" drew Nirvana to mainstream success, with Nevermind being released two weeks after the single's release. Following the album's release, the band and its management company debated whether to release "Come as You Are" or "In Bloom" as the next single from the album due to Cobain's concerns over similarity of the former with Killing Joke song "Eighties" (1984). After some persuasion by the management company, Cobain agreed to release "Come as You Are" as the second single because of its commercial potential. Killing Joke were upset over the song, and there were rumors that a lawsuit had been filed over the song, though the suit never materialized. Killing Joke guitarist Geordie Walker was said to be upset about the whole situation, and he felt that Nirvana (which according to Walker denied the connection between the songs) handled the matter poorly. Similarities between "Come as You Are" and "Life Goes On" by the Damned have also been noted. 

The music video for "Come as You Are" was directed by Kevin Kerslake, who drew inspiration for it from the cover artwork of Nevermind. Rolling Stone ranked "Come as You Are" 445th on its list of "The 500 Greatest Songs of All Time", and it placed 452nd on the 2010 edition of the list.

Background and recording
"Come as You Are" was one of the few new songs Nirvana recorded onto the rehearsal tape the group sent to producer Butch Vig prior to the recording of Nevermind in 1991. The group recorded the song with Vig during album sessions at Sound City Studios in Van Nuys, California, in early 1991. Cobain recorded his guitar solo in two takes, as well as three takes of vocals, of which the first was used. Vig then asked Cobain to double track his vocals throughout the entire song. During the harmony overdub session, Cobain accidentally sang the phrase "And I don't have a gun" too early, appearing the fourth time he sings the word "memoria" after the guitar solo. When this mistake was discovered, Cobain decided to keep it in the final recording. Vig sampled Cobain singing "memoria" from the middle of the song and placed it in the background of the song near the end twice. The band also performed an acoustic version of the song on MTV Unplugged on November 18, 1993. The recording later appeared on MTV Unplugged in New York in November 1994.

Composition and lyrics
"Come as You Are" is an alternative rock song that lasts for a duration of three minutes and thirty-eight seconds. According to the sheet music published at Musicnotes.com by BMG Rights Management, it is written in the time signature of common time, with a heavy rock tempo of 120 beats per minute. "Come as You Are" is composed in the key of E minor, while Kurt Cobain's vocal range spans one octave and one note, from a low of F3 to a high of F4. The song alternates between the chords of E5 and D5 during the verses and Esus4 and G in the pre-chorus, while at the refrain it changes to the chord progression of A–C5. It begins with Cobain playing an unaccompanied guitar riff for eight seconds. Cobain used an Electro-Harmonix Small Clone guitar chorus pedal to give his instrument a "watery" or "echoey" tone during the verses and pre-choruses and as a result of which, the pedal has been associated with the song ever since. He is joined by the rest of the band for the first verse, which is moody and subdued. Once the band reaches the chorus, the song reaches full volume. The shift in dynamics is a technique Nirvana used on many of its songs. The song features one of Cobain's longest guitar solos. "Kurt really did not play a lot of solos," Vig said. "This one is more of a melodic part based on the vocal melody. It's not trying to show off pyrotechnics. It complements the melody of the song."

Many have speculated the song to be about heroin, which Cobain was struggling with at the time of writing and recording. The lyrics "Come 
doused in mud, soaked in bleach" speak directly to a Seattle-area HIV prevention campaign from the time period encouraging addicts to sterilize their needles with bleach before using them with the tagline "If doused in mud, soak in bleach", and "As a friend, as a trend, as a known enemy", for some, was further allegory of addiction to the drug. After Cobain's death, Sub Pop records approached G. Alan Marlatt at the University of Washington to set up a memorial fund to establish an addiction treatment center titled the "Come as You Are" center, but the funding fell through after the record label was sold to Warner Music Group.

Cobain described the lyrics of "Come as You Are" as contradictory, and said the song was about "people and what they're expected to act like". Pointing to the line "Take your time, hurry up, choice is yours, don't be late", essayist Catherine J. Creswell writes that in Cobain's lyrics,  clump into strings of empty clichés whose own ostensible meaning is forced into contradictions or simple rhyme sound". 

In light of Cobain's suicide in 1994, Allmusic's Mark Deming suggests that hearing "Cobain sing 'and I swear that I don't have a gun' gives 'Come as You Are' an edge it was never meant to have when [Nevermind] was first released in 1991." Deming reasons that the "I don't have a gun" lyric is Cobain's "attempt to reassure listeners that ... his target is the world at large rather than the individuals in it, and that there was still room in this damaged world for everyone". Others have suggested the lyrics regarding the "gun" are metaphors for escapism and turmoil found in heroin usage.

Release
Wary of the similarity between the main riff of "Come as You Are" and English post-punk band Killing Joke's 1984 single "Eighties", Nirvana and its management were unsure about releasing the song as the second single from Nevermind. Danny Goldberg, head of Nirvana's management Gold Mountain, later revealed that "[w]e couldn't decide between 'Come as You Are' and 'In Bloom.' Kurt was nervous about 'Come as You Are' because it was too similar to a Killing Joke song but we all thought it was still the better song to go with. And, he was right, Killing Joke later did complain about it." Nirvana biographer Everett True writes that "Come as You Are" was eventually chosen for release as a single because "Goldberg favoured the more obviously commercial song".

It was anticipated that the first single from Nevermind, "Smells Like Teen Spirit", would be a "base-building alternative cut", while "Come as You Are" would be able to cross over into other radio formats. However, "Smells Like Teen Spirit" became a surprise hit and boosted the band's popularity, whereas "Come as You Are" served to maintain it. After its release as a single in March 1992, "Come as You Are" peaked at number 32 on the Billboard Hot 100. The single stayed on the chart for 18 weeks. The song also reached number three on the Billboard Mainstream and Modern Rock Tracks charts. The single also broke the top 10 of the UK Singles Chart, peaking at the ninth spot, where it was also the week's highest new entry. This song ranked number 82 in Blenders "The 500 Greatest Songs Since You Were Born", and 452nd on Rolling Stone's "500 Greatest Songs of All Time". In 2019, the song was placed at number 17 on Rolling Stones ranking of 102 Nirvana songs.

Although members of Killing Joke claimed the main guitar riff of "Come as You Are" plagiarized the riff of "Eighties", the band reportedly did not file a copyright infringement lawsuit, which Rolling Stone magazine attributes to "personal and financial reasons". However, conflicting reports state that Killing Joke did file a lawsuit but that it was either thrown out of court, or that it was dropped following Cobain's death. Geordie Walker, Killing Joke's guitar player, said that the band was "very pissed off about that, but it's obvious to everyone. We had two separate musicologists' reports saying it was. Our publisher sent their publisher a letter saying it was and they went 'Boo, never heard of ya!', but the hysterical thing about Nirvana saying they'd never heard of us was that they'd already sent us a Christmas card!"

Later it was also noted that a third song, the Damned's "Life Goes On", pre-dated both and contained a similar riff to both songs.

In 1999, "Come as You Are" was voted in at number 49 in Kerrang! magazine's "100 Greatest Rock Tracks Ever!". As of April 2016, according to Business Insider, "Come as You Are" was the sixth most streamed song from the 1990s on Spotify. According to Nielsen Music's year-end report for 2019, "Come as You Are" was the third most-played song of the decade on mainstream rock radio with 134,000 spins. All of the songs in the top 10 were from the 1990s.

Music video
The music video was directed by Kevin Kerslake, who later directed the videos for "Lithium", "In Bloom", and "Sliver", as well as Pantera's music video for "This Love". After the unsatisfactory experience filming the "Smells Like Teen Spirit" video with Samuel Bayer, Cobain selected Kerslake due to his impressionistic style. Cobain was unable to formulate any ideas beyond homaging the Nevermind album cover and including "a lot of purples and reds", so he let Kerslake conceptualize the clip. The band shot outdoor footage in a park in Hollywood Hills a few days prior to the main video shoot. Kerslake projected this footage in the background of many shots in the main part of the video.

The video features the band in a dark room, where the appearance of falling water in front of the band distorts and blurs the band members' forms (an idea suggested by Cobain). Throughout the video, clips such as cells multiplying at an incredible rate and an unborn organism in its embryonic stages are shown. The video also features Kurt Cobain swinging violently on a chandelier as water begins to flow into the room as well as a dog wearing a cone collar trying to go down stairs, a baby swimming underwater (a reference to the cover of Nevermind), and a pistol sinking. Towards the end, a clip of the band appears, with Cobain in the front, lying on the ground and kissing the camera.

In popular culture

In 2005, a sign was put up in Aberdeen, Washington, Cobain's hometown, that reads "Welcome to Aberdeen: Come As You Are" as a tribute to Cobain. The sign was paid for and created by the Kurt Cobain Memorial Committee, a non-profit organization created in May 2004 to honor Cobain. Founded by author Jeff Burlingame and Aberdeen City Councilman Paul Fritts, the Committee also plans to create a Kurt Cobain Memorial Park and a youth center in Aberdeen.

The song appears in two scenes of "Definitely, Maybe", a 2008 film starring Ryan Reynolds, and is a thematic element.

The 2016 film As You Are was named after the Nirvana track. The plot "revolves around a trio of high schoolers in the 1990s, trying to find their way through the difficult maze of adolescence."

A cover of the song, performed by Civil Twilight, appears in the end scene of the Defiance episode Down in the Ground Where the Dead Men Go.

A remix of the song was used for trailers of Marvel's 2017 Netflix series The Defenders.
It also made an appearance in the 2019 film Captain Marvel, and subsequently peaked at number 11 on the Billboard Hot Rock Songs chart with a 267 percent increase to 2000 downloads sold and a 30 percent increase to 2.8 million US streams in week ending March 14, 2019.

The song "Adam's Song" by Blink-182 references "Come as You Are." "Come as You Are" features the lyrics, "Take your time, hurry up, the choice is yours, don't be late," while "Adam's Song," in turn, features the lyrics, "I took my time, I hurried up, the choice was mine, I didn't think enough."

The song was also featured in the closing credits of the Season 2 finale of the Apple TV+ alternative history series For All Mankind.

"Come As You Are (House Mix)" is an electronic tribute with trumpeter Maurice "Mobetta" Brown and house music DJ Chip E. from Nirvana Reimagined as House and Techno by producers Jonathan Hay and Cain McKnight.

Track listing

UK 7" single 
 "Come as You Are" — 3:38
 "Endless, Nameless" — 6:40

US 7" single 
 "Come as You Are" — 3:38
 "Drain You" (Live) — 3:35

UK 12" single 
 "Come as You Are" — 3:38
 "Endless, Nameless" — 6:40
 "Drain You" (Live) — 3:35

UK 12" picture disc 
 "Come as You Are" — 3:38
 "Endless, Nameless" — 6:40
 "School" (Live) — 2:31

UK CD single 
 "Come as You Are" — 3:38
 "Endless, Nameless" — 6:40
 "School" (Live) — 2:31
 "Drain You" (Live)" — 3:35

US CD single 
 "Come as You Are" — 3:38
 "School" (Live) — 2:31
 "Drain You" (Live)" — 3:35

Japanese mini CD single 
 "Come as You Are" — 3:38
 "Endless, Nameless" — 6:40

US cassette single 
 "Come as You Are" — 3:38
 "Drain You" (Live) — 3:35

Australian cassette single 
 "Come as You Are" — 3:38
 "Endless, Nameless" — 6:40

Charts

Weekly charts

Year-end charts

Decade-end charts

Certifications

Personnel
Nirvana
 Kurt Cobainvocals, acoustic guitar, electric guitar
 Krist Novoselicbass guitar
 Dave Grohldrums

Technical
 Butch Vigrecording, mixing engineer, producer

References

Notes

External links

 at Allmusic

1991 songs
1992 singles
DGC Records singles
Music videos directed by Kevin Kerslake
Nirvana (band) songs
Songs about heroin
Songs involved in plagiarism controversies
Song recordings produced by Butch Vig
Songs written by Kurt Cobain